Leuch is a surname. People with that name include:

 Éric le Leuch (born 1971), French sprint canoer
 Morten Leuch (1732-1768), Norwegian timber trader and landowner
 Peter F. Leuch (1883-1959), American lawyer and politician

See also
 Annie Leuch-Reineck (1880-1978), Swiss mathematician and women's rights activist
 Leuchs, a surname